A pact, from Latin pactum ("something agreed upon"), is a formal agreement between two or more parties. In international relations, pacts are usually between two or more sovereign states. In domestic politics, pacts are usually between two or more political parties or other organizations.

Notable international pacts include:

 Anti-Comintern Pact between Germany and Japan (1936)
 Auto Pact between Canada and the United States (1965)
 Bretton Woods Pact made stable financial and commercial relations viable between United States, Canada, Western European countries, Australia, and Japan (after 1944)
 Kellogg–Briand Pact, a multilateral treaty against war (1928)
 London Debt Agreement between London and Germany was a debt relief pact (1953)
 London Pact between Italy and the Triple Entente (Great Britain, France, and Russia) (1915)
 Molotov–Ribbentrop Pact between Germany and the Soviet Union (1939)
 Soviet–Japanese Neutrality Pact (1941)
 North Atlantic pact, organizing the North Atlantic Treaty Organization (1949)
 Pact of Steel between Italy and Germany (1939)
 Pact of the Triple Alliance which formed the basis of alliance between Empire of Brazil, Argentina and Uruguay against Paraguay
 Stability and Growth Pact between European Union member states about fiscal policy (1997)
 Tripartite Pact between Italy, Germany, and Japan (1940)
 U.S.–North Korea Agreed Framework concerning the latter country's development of nuclear power (1994)
 Warsaw Pact of Eastern European communist countries, led by the Soviet Union (1955-1991)

Myth
 Deal with the Devil

External links

See also
 Blood Pact (disambiguation)
 Compact (disambiguation)
 Covenant (historical)
 Gentlemen's agreement
 Suicide pact
 Trade pact
 Contract
 Treaty
 Truce
 PACT Act (disambiguation)

References

International relations

sv:Pakt